"Love Can Build a Bridge" is a song written by Naomi Judd, Paul Overstreet, and John Barlow Jarvis, and recorded by American country music duo the Judds. It was released in 1990 as the second single and title track from their album of the same name. It was a top-five country hit in mid-1991. The song has inspired several cover versions, including one by Cher, Chrissie Hynde, Neneh Cherry, and Eric Clapton that topped the UK Singles Chart in 1995.

Content and composition
The song is about the importance of always standing together, and was co-written by Naomi Judd and dedicated to the Judd family and fans as almost a goodbye, as at the time, Naomi was chronically ill with Hepatitis C and was forced to retire as it had been speculated that she had only three years left to live. "Love Can Build a Bridge" is performed in the key of B major with a tempo of 66 beats per minute in common time.  The vocals span from E3 to D5.

Charts

Weekly charts

Year-end charts

Comic Relief version

A new version of "Love Can Build a Bridge" recorded by American singers Cher and Chrissie Hynde, Swedish singer Neneh Cherry, and British singer-guitarist Eric Clapton was released as 1995's official Comic Relief single. This version topped the UK Singles Chart for one week in March 1995; it was Cher's and Hynde's second solo UK number-one hit and the only UK number-one single for both Cherry and Clapton.

Charts

Weekly charts

Year-end charts

Certifications and sales

Other cover versions

The song was covered by Children for Rwanda as a charity single in aid of Save the Children. This version was released on August 30, 1994, and reached number 57 on the UK Singles Chart the following month.

References

External links
 Naomi & Wynonna: Love Can Build a Bridge at Internet Movie Database

1990 singles
1990 songs
1995 singles
Cher songs
Comic Relief singles
Country ballads
Curb Records singles
Eric Clapton songs
The Judds songs
London Records singles
Neneh Cherry songs
Number-one singles in Scotland
Pop ballads
RCA Records Nashville singles
Song recordings produced by Brent Maher
Songs written by John Barlow Jarvis
Songs written by Naomi Judd
Songs written by Paul Overstreet
UK Singles Chart number-one singles